Samuel LaVoice (August 1882 – April 6, 1905) was an American cyclist. He competed in the men's 25 miles event at the 1904 Summer Olympics.

References

External links
 

1882 births
1905 deaths
American male cyclists
Olympic cyclists of the United States
Cyclists at the 1904 Summer Olympics
Sportspeople from Syracuse, New York